The CBBC Summer Social was an outdoor festival organised by the British children's television channel CBBC, aimed at children, which took place on the weekend of 3–4/5 August 2018. The festival was held at Croxteth Hall, Liverpool, and includes performances from performers such as Union J, HRVY, Mackenzie Ziegler and Matt Terry. Plans for the festival in 2018, the first of its kind organised by the BBC, were revealed on 27 March 2018, with the venue and some of the acts scheduled to appear announced on that day.

References

2018 establishments in England
Music festivals in Merseyside
Music festivals established in 2018
August 2018 events in the United Kingdom
2018 in British television